Golden Delicious were a Portland, Oregon-based band active in the mid- and late-1990s. Their members included, at various times, Pete Krebs (guitar), Kevin Richey (banjo), Paul Bassett (washboard), Marilee Hord (fiddle), Jesse Spero (drums), and David Reisch (bass). Their music has been described as country, bluegrass, and having "a punk rock energy and a slightly irreverent attitude." David Goodman wrote in Modern Twang that the band "combines the spirited new old-time style of groups like the Highwoods String Band or the Freight Hoppers with the madcap attitude of the Holy Modal Rounders." Hord told No Depression that the band did not like when they were labeled as a specific genre like "alt-country", saying, "When you categorize music, you degrade it." The band released their debut album, Old School, on Cavity Search Records in 1997.

Discography
Old School (Cavity Search, 1997)
Cavity Search (Cavity Search, 1998)
Live at the Laurelthirst (Cavity Search, 1999)

References

Musical groups from Portland, Oregon
Cavity Search Records artists
American bluegrass music groups
American country music groups